Wallace Augustus Rayfield (1874–1941), was an American architect and educator. He was the second formally educated practicing African American architect in the United States.

Biography
Wallace Augustus Rayfield was born around May 10, 1874 in Bibb County near Macon, Georgia. Rayfield attended schools in Macon, Georgia before moving to Washington, D.C. to live with his aunt after the death of his mother. 

He was an apprentice at an architectural firm A. B. Mullett and Co. while attending Howard University. Rayfield received a B.S. degree 1896 in Classics from Howard University. He then completed a graduate certificate in 1898 from Pratt Institute, before earning his bachelor of architecture (B. Arch) in architecture from Columbia University in 1899. 

Upon graduation, he was recruited by Booker T. Washington to the role Directorship of the Architectural and Mechanical Drawing Department at Tuskegee Institute (now Tuskegee University) in Tuskegee, Alabama. His students included William Sidney Pittman, and Vertner Woodson Tandy.

In 1907, Rayfield opened a professional office in Tuskegee, Alabama from which he sold mail-order plans nationwide. He also advertised "branch offices" in Birmingham, Montgomery, Mobile and Talladega, Alabama and Atlanta, Savannah, Macon and Augusta, Georgia. He left Tuskegee Institute and moved to Birmingham, Alabama in 1908 to focus on his young practice. He was elected as Superintending Architect for the Freedman's Aid Society, and Connectional Architect of the African Methodist Episcopal Zion Church.

He died on February 28, 1941.

Notable work
 Birmingham Art Club (1908), Birmingham, Alabama
 Dr. Arthur M. Brown Residence (1908), 319-4th Terrace, Birmingham, Alabama; demolished
 Sixth Avenue Baptist Church (1909), 1531-6th Avenue, Birmingham, Alabama
 16th Street Baptist Church (1911), Birmingham, Alabama
 People's A.M.E. Zion Church (1911), Syracuse, New York 
 T.C. Windham Construction Company Office Building (1912), Birmingham, Alabama
Alabama Penny Savings Bank/Knights of Pythian Temple Building (1913), Birmingham, Alabama
R. A. Blount Residence (1914), 322-6th Avenue North, Birmingham, Alabama
 32nd Street Baptist Church (1924), Birmingham, Alabama
 Antioch Baptist Church (1926), 956 W. 9th Street, Cincinnati, Ohio 
 Trinity Baptist Church, Birmingham, Alabama
 Harmony Street Baptist Church, Birmingham, Alabama
 Metropolitan A.M.E. Zion Church, Birmingham, Alabama
 Ebenezer Baptist Church, Chicago, Illinois
 St Paul's Episcopal Church, Batesville, Arkansas
 Trinity Building, South Africa
 Mt. Zion Baptist Church, Pensacola, Florida
 Morning Star Baptist Church, Demopolis, Alabama
 Marlinton Methodist Church, Marlinton, West Virginia
 Marlinton Presbyterian Church, Marlinton, West Virginia
 Mt. Pilgrim Baptist Church, Milton, Florida
 Madame Clisby Residence, Birmingham, Alabama
 Rocky Springs Presbyterian Church, Laurens, South Carolina
 First Missionary Baptist Church, Decatur, Alabama
 Pythian Temple Building, Cotton Avenue, Macon, Georgia
St. Luke African Methodist Episcopal Church, Birmingham, Alabama
First Congregational Church (now part of Talladega College), Talladega, Alabama
Dorms at Haven Institute and Conservatory of Music, Meridian, Mississippi

See also
 Robert R. Taylor, the first professionally trained African American architect in the U.S.
 African-American architects

References

 Hamilton, G. P. (1911) "W. A. Rayfield, B. S., Birmingham, Ala." in Beacon Lights of the Race. Memphis, E. H. Clarke & Brother, pp. 451–7
 Brown, Charles A. (1972) W. A. Rayfield: Pioneer Black Architect of Birmingham, Ala. Birmingham: Gray Printing Company
 McKenzie, Vinson. (Fall 1993) "A Pioneering African-American Architect in Alabama: Wallace A. Rayfield, 1874–1941." Journal of the Interfaith Forum on Religion, Art & Architecture. Vol. 13
 Durough, Allan R. (2010) The Architectural Legacy of Wallace A. Rayfield: Pioneer Black Architect of Birmingham, Alabama. Tuscaloosa: University of Alabama Press

External links
 Wallace A. Rayfield site by Allen R. Durough at the Wayback Machine archived (March 16, 2012)
 Wallace Rayfield at BhamWiki.com

1874 births
1941 deaths
People from Macon, Georgia
Artists from Birmingham, Alabama
20th-century American architects
Pratt Institute alumni
Columbia Graduate School of Architecture, Planning and Preservation alumni
African-American architects
20th-century African-American people